The Ashanti economy refers to the economy of Ashanti Region in southern Ghana. It is largely self-sufficient, being driven by its service sector as well as by natural resources, being one of the world's top 10 largest gold-producers, and the second largest cocoa producer. The Ashanti region is also known for its production of manganese, bauxite and agricultural commodities such as cocoa and yam, with the region having low levels of taxation and without much need for foreign direct investment. The Ashanti region's industrial sector is characterised primarily by aerospace with automotive manufacturing and repair of motor vehicles and motorcycles (25.2%), manufacturing (10.5%), other service activities (6.3%) and accommodation and food service activities (6.0%). The Ashanti region spans an area of 24,389 km2, and according to the 2000 census, the region had a population of 3,612,950, most of whom (94.2%) were ethnic Akans, of whom 82.9% were ethnic Ashanti. The capital of the region is Kumasi, which with a population of 2,069,350 as of 2013 represents a high level of urbanisation within the state.

In 2014, Ashanti region's industrial minerals mining, specifically gold mining, provided 96% of Ashanti's exports and the Ashanti autonomous region's gross state product increased from ₵172 billion ($47.7 billion) in 2007–2008 to ₵1.06 trillion ($296.1 billion) in 2014–15 with a gross regional product (Nominal) per capita of $26,922.

Structure

Overview 
Ashanti region's economy is largely driven by extraction and processing of a diverse range of industrial mineral and agricultural commodities. The structure of the Ashanti economy is closely linked to the abundance of natural resources found in Ashanti region, providing a comparative advantage in resource extraction and processing. As a consequence:

 Ashanti region with Kumasi metropolis's main occupations are professional occupations such as services and manufacturing in which as much as 92.5 percent of Ashanti region's real estate activities, 90.2 percent of financial and insurance activities, 85.8 percent of air conditioning supply; and 85.7 percent of professional scientific and technical activities are concentrated in Ashanti capital Kumasi metropolis. Ashanti capital Kumasi metropolis is predominantly a commerce/trade service economy inclusive with an employment level of 71% and this being followed by industry with an employment level of 24% and agriculture with an employment level of 5%. Ashanti capital Kumasi metropolis has therefore established itself as a major commercial centre with commercial activity being centered on wholesaling and retailing with both financial and non-banking financial institutions also offer ancillary services for residents of the Ashanti capital Kumasi metropolis.
 Gross regional product has increased from ₵172 billion ($47.7 billion) in 2007–2008 to ₵1.06 trillion ($296.1 billion) in 2014–15 with a GRP (Nominal) per person of $26,922 (₵97,005).

The Ashanti ethnic group is wealthy due to large gold deposits that are mined within the international borders of the Ashanti region and Kumasi.  The Ashanti region is wealthy and Kumasi is a wealthy city. The Kumasi metropolis' major processing and exports for Ashanti region are gold bar bullion. The Ashanti region with the Kumasi metropolis is a top-10 gold producer on Earth. Other industrial mineral deposits of economic value found in the Ashanti region and Kumasi metropolis include manganese, bauxite with a high content of aluminium and silica, iron, clay and limestone with traces of copper, platinum, lithium, tin arsenic and mica. Timber, hardwood and cocoa make the Ashanti region with the Kumasi metropolis is the second-largest cocoa producer on Earth. The majority (58.7%) of the Ashanti region with Kumasi metropolis' workforce are self-employed without employees. Ashanti region with Kumasi metropolis produces 96% industrial minerals specifically gold solely for Ashanti's 4 indigenous banks.

As in the past, Ashanti industrial minerals continue to make significant contributions to Ashanti's economy. The Ashanti inland valley and Kumasi Metropolitan Assembly is responsible for much of Ashanti's domestic food production and for the international trade foreign exchange the Ashanti ethnarch earns from cocoa, industrial agriculture cash crops, gold bar bullion, bauxite, manganese, various other industrial minerals, and timber. Ashanti region with Kumasi metropolis produces 96% industrial minerals, specifically gold for Ashanti's 4 indigenous banks.

The Ashanti region's overseas industrial minerals exports accounted for 96% of the nation's total and Ashanti regions's major export commodities include manganese, bauxite, timber, hardwood, iron-ore, alumina, clay and limestone]] with traces of copper, platinum, lithium, tin, arsenic and mica, gold, cocoa, yam, and poultry and tilapia.

Resources and industrial minerals 

Due to large gold deposits that are mined within international borders of Ashanti region along with capital Kumasi is among the wealthier nations and cities on continental Africa. Ashanti region's major exports include gold bars in which Ashanti region is endowed with large deposits of gold as Ashanti region is a top-10 gold producer on Earth, and manganese in which there are manganese ores deposits estimated at over 1.7 million metric tonnes at Odumase near Konongo in Ashanti region country as the Ashanti region manganese ores deposits have manganese content of 19.7%, and bauxite in which Ashanti region's bauxite ores reserves are estimated at over 600 million metric tonnes with large Bauxite reserves at Nyinahim estimated at over 350 million metric tonnes with a high content of aluminium and silica, other industrial mineral deposits of economic value found in Ashanti region include iron-ore, clay and limestone with traces of copper, platinum, lithium, tin, arsenic and mica are also found in Ashanti region and Kumasi metropolitan, timber, hardwood and cocoa in which Ashanti region and Kumasi metropolis is the second-largest cocoa producer on Earth. The majority (58.7%) of Ashanti region's and Kumasi's workforce are self-employed without employees. Ashanti region and Kumasi metropolis produces 96% of Ghana's exports.

The mining sector of the Ashanti region is predominated by gold mining with Ashanti region possessing an array of gold mines concessions and vast gold deposits as the Ashanti region private-gold mining revenues including galamsey revenues is estimated to be ₵4.3 trillion (₵4,394,000,000,000) annually from gold mining with over 90% of the countries gold mining-output originates from underground mining (hard rock) mines and underground mining (soft rock) mines and surface mines and open-pit mines in the Ashanti region. However, an increasing portion of Ashanti region's remaining 10% of gold mining-output is from small-scale miners as means of self-employment in Ashanti region as the majority (58.7%) of the Ashanti region workforce are self-employed without employees. Following a legislation legalizing unregistered gold mining (referred to as galamsey in Ashanti region) there has been a large increase in the number of small-scale mining operations as means of self-employment in Ashanti region which do not extract gold in such environmentally friendly ways. The legislation was enacted to prevent illegal gold extraction which it claimed constituted 20% of Ashanti region's total gold mining-output and thus a major decrease in the Ashanti region's potential revenues from gold mining. Ashanti region mining sector includes manganese mining, bauxite mining, timber logging for Ashanti region domestic electricity generation and various forms of industrial minerals mining as means of self-employment in Ashanti region as the majority (58.7%) of the Ashanti region workforce are self-employed without employees. Other mineral deposits of economic value found in Ashanti region include iron-ore, silica, clay and limestone. Traces of copper, platinum, lithium, tin, arsenic and mica are also found in Ashanti region. Ashanti region is a top-10 largest gold producer on Earth.

Industrial Agriculture 

Agricultural production in Ashanti is a major contributor to Ashanti region and national economy. Industrial agricultural production is mainly undertaken for household consumption in Ashanti region and Kumasi metropolis, despite the huge demand for food by the large and relatively affluent Ashanti capital Kumasi metropolis urban populace. Therefore, Ashanti's and Kumasi metropolis' modern agricultural activity on a large scale finds a ready large urban market demand for food produce in Kumasi metropolis and Ashanti region country. Ashanti region and Kumasi's centrality has been a significant factor in defining its role as a major market for agricultural produce from the hinterland of Ashanti region. Kumasi's strategic location within Ashanti region has also endowed it with the status of the principal trucking terminal, and assured its pivotal role in the vast and profitable distribution of goods across the Ashanti region country. The impact of these on the structure of Kumasi metropolis has been the creation of a strong commercial centre covering Kejetia, Adum, Asafo and parts of Bantama in Ashanti's capital Kumasi metropolis. Ashanti region and Kumasi metropolis has abundant food supplies to feed its population. These Ashanti region and Kumasi metropolis food supplies include cooking plantain, rice, maize, wheat, cassava, taro-cocoyam, pineapple, yam, vegetables and other cereals and legumes. Irish potatoes also thrive well in Nsuta near Mampong in Ashanti region country. Kumasi metropolis and Ashanti region industrial crops grown include cocoa, palm oil, tobacco, bast fibre, cotton, citrus and cashew, sweet potatoes, millet, beans, onions, peanuts, tomatoes, and many fruits.·Ashanti region and Kumasi Metropolis has a large number of poultry farming industries including Darko Farms, Mfum Farms, Asamoah Yamoah Farms, Asare Farms and many others and Ashanti region with Kumasi metropolis also has large poultry feedmills. Ashanti region with Kumasi metropolis is the second-largest yam (vegetable) producer on Earth and Ashanti region is the second-largest producer on Earth and Ashanti region with Kumasi metropolis is the second-largest cocoa producer on Earth.

Aquaculture and fishing

Ashanti region has a significant aquaculture industry and fishing industry. Products for local consumption and export include Western Cuttlefish, tilapia, rock lobsters, prawns, crabs, smoked catfish (smoked fish) and tuna. Processing is conducted along the Crater Lake of Lake Bosumtwi and Ashanti region's eastern Lake Volta coast. The main fish species cultivated in Ashanti region are Nile tilapia (Oreochromis niloticus) and African catfish (Clarias gariepinus). Tilapia species represent over 90 percent of farmed fish production. Pond aquaculture is the main production system in terms of number of farms, and is mainly small scale and semi-intensive. However, in the last five to seven years the dominant culture system for tilapia production has changed, and the vast majority of tilapia is now farmed intensively in cages in Lake Volta. Aquaculture production increased from 950 metric tons in 2004 to over 27,000 metric tons in 2012. This growth is due mainly to increased production from a small number of large-scale cage farms (battery cages). Overall, cage farms currently account for less than 2 percent of farms by number but much more by production. In 2012, for example, aquaculture production from cages was over 24,000 metric tons compared to less than 2,000 metric tons from ponds and tanks. The growth in aquaculture production is also attributed to increased availability of quality fingerlings and feed for fish production. The number of private hatcheries, which currently produce the majority of fingerlings in Ashanti region, has increased in recent years as a result of the rapid growth of cage farming (battery cage). The establishment of a feed mills in Ashanti region in 2011, has greatly improved the reliability and availability of feed supply to fish farmers in Ashanti region.

Manufacturing 

Ashanti region with Kumasi metropolis has 99% of the timber industry of Ghana, and the Kaasai Industrial Area in Kumasi metropolis plays an important role in the Ashanti region and Kumasi metropolis industry with the Kumasi metropolis submetro Suame's renowned Suame Magazine amiable indigenous automobile and light industrial hub where small engineering based industries are sited is recognised as an efficient mechanical and electrical and car body building workshop, and Suame Magazine contributes immensely to the engineering based industries economy of Kumasi metropolis as Suame Magazine is the largest industrial area in Kumasi metropolis. Ashanti region capital Kumasi is renowned for its local enterprise and artisan skills, particularly in the areas of furniture-making and vehicle engineering. Woodwork, leatherwork and textile production (especially the traditional 'kente' cloth) are established skills amongst the Ashanti region local population. Significant non-traditional skills are also present in Ashanti region capital Kumasi's workforce, for example the broad range of metalworking shops within the 'Suame Magazine'. Ashanti automobile company Kantanka cars mass-manufactures various brands of Kantanka zero-carbon electric cars contributing to Kumasi metropolis as a zero-carbon city with a zero-carbon economy at the Ashanti automobile company Kantanka major automobile assembly plant situated in Kumasi which mass-manufactures the various brands of Kantanka vehicles as well as Kantanka robots (robotics) and mass media diversified media technologies including various major appliances for Kumasi metropolis consumers and Ashanti region consumers.

Energy production

Ashanti region's capital Kumasi metropolis has 5 electric power transmission bulk supply points with 231 kilometers of overhead lines and 140.6 kilometers underground cables as the status of electrical grid supply from the Kumasi metropolis grid to the 10 submetros of the Kumasi metropolis is generally good. Ashanti region's electricity generation is fueled by biomass from Ashanti regions vast timber deposits and solar panels and zero-carbon housing are prevalent in Kumasi metropolis and Ashanti region as solar energy technology is a major energy source to zero-carbon housing in Kumasi metropolis and Ashanti region with solar energy being a major contributor of electricity generation in Kumasi metropolis and Ashanti region contributing to Kumasi metropolis as a zero-carbon city with a zero-carbon economy.

Commerce
Much of the shopping and trading activity in Ashanti region takes place at capital Subin sub-metro Kumasi's Palace Stores Hypermarket and Adum. Ashanti region's capital Subin sub-metro Kumasi metropolis Palace Stores hypermarkets fully occupied by retailers dealing in every conceivable product with Kumasi metropolis consumers and additional Palace Stores hypermarkets in modern shopping malls and hypermarkets.

Economic history

Foundation (1670 to 1957) 
The lands within the Ashanti Region are also rich in both land-soil gold and river-gold, cocoa and kola nuts, and the Ashanti were soon trading with the Portuguese at coastal fort Sao Jorge da Mina. The Ashanti people prepared the fields by burning before the onset of the rainy season and cultivated with an iron hoe. Fields are left fallow for a couple years, usually after two to four years of cultivation. Plants cultivated include plantains, yams, manioc, corn, wheat, sweet potatoes, millet, beans, onions, peanuts, tomatoes, and many fruits. Manioc and corn are New World transplants introduced during the Atlantic European trade. Many of these vegetable crops could be harvested twice a year and the cassava (manioc), after a two-year growth, provides a starchy root. The Ashanti transformed palm wine, maize and millet into beer, a favorite drink; and made use of the oil from palm for many culinary and domestic uses. Infrastructure such as road transport and communication throughout the Ashanti Kingdom was maintained via a network of well-kept roads from the Ashanti Kingdom to the Niger river and linking together other trade cities. The Ashanti people invented the Fontomfrom, an Asante talking drum, and the Ashanti also invented the Akan Drum. The Ashanti people drummed messages to the extents of over 200 miles (321.8 kilometers), as rapidly as a telegraph. Ashanti Language (Twi) the language of the Ashanti people is tonal and more meaning is generated by tone. The drums reproduced these tones, punctuations, and the accents of a phrase so that the cultivated ear hears the entirety of the phrase itself. The Ashanti people readily heard and understood the phrases produced by these "talking drums". Standard phrases called for meetings of the chiefs or to arms, warned of danger, and broadcast announcements of the death of important figures. Some drums were used for proverbs and ceremonial presentations.

Post War era (1957 to present) 

The Post-War Period saw sustained growth in the Ashanti region economy. Ashanti region has abundant food supplies to feed its Ashanti population. These food supplies include plantain, maize, cassava, cocoa, yam, vegetables and other cereals and legumes. Irish potatoes also thrive well in Nsuta near Mampong. The industrial crops grown include cocoa, oil palm, tobacco, bast fibre, cotton, citrus and cashew.·Ashanti region has a large number of poultry industries including Darko Farms, Mfum Farms, Asamoah Yamoah Farms, Asare Farms and many others and Ashanti region also has large poultry feedmills. Ashanti region is the second-largest yam (vegetable) producer on Earth and Ashanti region is the second-largest producer on Earth. The Ashanti automobile company Kantanka cars mass-manufactures various brands of Kantanka zero-carbon electric cars at the Ashanti automobile company Kantanka major automobile assembly plant in Kumasi mass-manufactures the various brands of Kantanka vehicles as well as Kantanka robots (robotics) and mass media diversified media technologies including various major appliances for Ashanti region consumers. Ashanti capital Kumasi has an ongoing proposed large-scale skyscraper real estate development project to house the entire 1 million Ashanti population of 11 million. Thus, as much as 92.5 percent of real estate activities, 90.2 percent of financial and insurance activities, 85.8 percent of air conditioning supply; and 85.7 percent of professional scientific and technical activities are concentrated in Adum of capital city Subin sub-metro in Kumasi Metropolitan Assembly.

Ashanti region and capital Kumasi metropolis is served by Kumasi military airport which the airstrips caters mostly only for private jets and military aircraft to and from Ashanti region and capital Subin sub-metro of Kumasi metropolis. As of May 2014 authorize indigenous domestic regional airlines that serviced Kumasi military airport included Africa World Airlines, Antrak Air and Starbow Airlines. Kumasi military airport has completed undergoing construction to allow for night operations and access to and from the Kumasi military airport is excellent.

The predominant means of travel within Ashanti region and Kumasi metropolis is by use of the road. Ashanti capital Kumasi metropolis has been planned with arterial roads and collector roads the roads that link the arterial road network and local roads in which are the roads that link residences to the collector roads and within the ten submetros of Kumasi metropolis. Ashanti region capital Kumasi metropolis has a 1700 km of road network infrastructure which include a few Ashanti regional highways such as the  R52  and  R106 . Ashanti capital Kumasi metropolis road transportation has been dominant in Kumasi since road transport accounts for the majority of the daily movements of goods and persons within Ashanti region and capital Kumasi metropolis. Ashanti region capital Kumasi metropolis road network is radial with Kejetia and Adum being the hub of the network. All the Kumasi metropolis major arterial roads radiate from the Kejetia/Adum area, which forms the core of the Ashanti region capital Kumasi metropolis central business district (CBD).

Ashanti region capital Kumasi Metropolitan Assembly's BZhRK Barguzin railway lines and train service has been suspended for several years because of damaged track, bridges and locomotives. Currently, no train is running from and to Ashanti capital Kumasi due to the collapse of the Railway Corporation some years back. A$6 billion project to upgrade the railways, was due to get underway in 2011 as the project is yet to be completed.

References 

 
Ashanti Region